Carlos Miguel Correia Fonseca (born 5 January 1985 in Senhora da Hora, Matosinhos) is a Portuguese former footballer who played as a goalkeeper.

References

External links

1985 births
Living people
Sportspeople from Matosinhos
Portuguese footballers
Association football goalkeepers
Liga Portugal 2 players
Segunda Divisão players
Leixões S.C. players
Padroense F.C. players
Moreirense F.C. players
Vitória F.C. players
S.C. Salgueiros players